The list of symphonies in A-flat minor includes:

 Arnold Bax
 Symphony No. 7 (the key is not specified in the title; from observation, the key is A-flat minor.)

 Dimitrie Cuclin
 Symphony No. 11 (1950)

References

See also
List of symphonies in G-sharp minor
List of symphonies by key

A flat minor
Symphonies